Layyah is a city in Punjab, Pakistan.

Layyah may also refer to:

Places 
Layyah District, a district of Punjab (Pakistan)
Layyah Tehsil, a tehsil of district Layyah
Layyah, Sharjah, a village in the United Arab Emirates

People
Layyah Barakat, a Syrian-born writer.
Laylah Ali, an American visual artist.

See also
 Laya (disambiguation)